Olivier Ruel (born 24 July 1981 in Aubervilliers, France) is one of the most successful professional Magic: The Gathering players. He holds the record for most Grand Prix Top 8’s, and is one of twenty players with five or more Pro Tour top 8’s. After Pro Tour San Juan 2010, Olivier surpassed Kai Budde as the leader in lifetime Pro Points. However, Budde regained that title later that season.

Career 
Born in Aubervilliers, France, Olivier and his brother Antoine started playing Magic in 1994. Olivier won the first Pro Tour Qualifier he attended and thereby qualified for Pro Tour Rome 1999. After a mid-table result there he teamed up with his brother and Florent Jeudon for Pro Tour Washington D.C., going under the name of "Phenome J". They finished eleventh at the Pro Tour and quickly followed that up with a victory at Grand Prix Cannes, now going as "Black Ops". These achievements were rewarded with a ranking-based invitation to the Masters Series at Pro Tour New York 2000. Again Black Ops prevailed defeating Game Empire consisting of Alan Comer, Brian Selden, and Kurt Burgner as well as the Antarctica-team of Jon Finkel, O'Mahoney-Schwartz brothers.

Their first major individual success came several months later when the Ruel brothers met in the final of Grand Prix Porto where Antoine defeated Olivier. Another few months later in May 2001 Olivier secured himself a place on the French national team by finishing third at French Nationals. His first Pro Tour Top 8 followed in March 2002 where he finished second at Pro Tour Osaka. Olivier has since racked up an unprecedented 28 Grand Prix Top 8 finishes, winning five. He also has five Pro Tour Top 8 finishes and won the French Nationals in 2004. In 2008, Olivier was voted in the Hall of Fame and was inducted at the World Championship in Memphis.

Accomplishments

Top 8 Appearances

Other accomplishments 
 Inducted into the Hall of Fame in 2008

References

Living people
French Magic: The Gathering players
People from Aubervilliers
1981 births